Love Songs and Prayers: A Retrospective is the first compilation album from Christian alternative rock band the Choir, released in 1995.

Background
When the Choir was contacted by Myrrh Records about releasing a "best of" collection, the band requested to choose the songs themselves, and the label agreed. The organization of the songs into "love songs and prayers" was suggested by saxophone and Lyricon player Dan Michaels when he heard drummer and lyricist Steve Hindalong use that term in an interview to describe the Choir’s body of work.

Although released by Myrrh, the compilation chronologically presents songs from all their releases, regardless of record label, up to that point. The unreleased alternate versions of "A Million Years" and "All Night Long" were originally re-recorded in 1985 with producer Mark Heard after Michaels had joined the band, and appear for the first time on this collection.

The digipack CD case was designed by singer Christine Glass (using the name "Christy Coxe" in her role as art director). She would eventually record backup vocals for the Choir on a consistent basis beginning with 2000's Flap Your Wings. Her husband, Marc Byrd, would subsequently join the band in 2005.

Critical response

At the time of its release, Love Songs and Prayers was well-received. Sam Hargreaves, writing for Cross Rhythms said “the quality of the songwriting progresses through the album, and the lyrics are consistently good.”

Retrospectively, Darryl Cater at AllMusic praised the “great deal of variety” on the compilation, and added that “the result of this interesting mix is (and has always been) a sense of persistent hopefulness in the face of darkness.”

Track listing
All songs written by Steve Hindalong and Derri Daugherty, unless otherwise specified.

Personnel
The Choir
 Derri Daugherty – lead vocals, guitars, bass guitar, producer
 Steve Hindalong – drums, percussion, producer
 Tim Chandler – bass guitar, vocals
 Dan Michaels – saxophone, Lyricon

Additional musicians
 Bill Batstone – guitar, bass guitar ("A Million Years," "All Night Long," "Render Love," "Black Cloud")
 Robin Spurs – bass guitar, vocals ("To Bid Farewell," "Car, Etc.")
 Mike Sauerbrey – bass guitar ("Restore My Soul")
 Mark Heard – background vocals ("About Love")
 Jerry Chamberlain – background vocals ("Merciful Eyes")
 Sharon McCall – background vocals ("A Sentimental Song")

Production
 Ken Love – digital editing and mastering
 Christy Coxe – art direction
 Norma Jean Roy – photography
 Astrid Herbold – design

References

External links
 

1995 compilation albums
The Choir (alternative rock band) albums